The Green Leopard Plague is a 2004 novella by Walter Jon Williams. It was first published in Asimov's Science Fiction.

Synopsis

Centuries after the introduction of a genetically engineered virus allows humans to photosynthesize food, leading the world to a post-scarcity society, a mermaid makes her living by searching old archives. She is approached by a customer who wants her to find information on the man who founded the theoretical background on which their civilization is based, John Terzian. It is eventually revealed that he was involved in the release of the photosynthesis virus. The story then veers back and forward between his story and the mermaid's.

In 2010, Night Shade Books republished The Green Leopard Plague as the titular piece of a collection of Williams' short works.

Reception

The Green Leopard Plague won the 2004 Nebula Award for Best Novella, and was a finalist for the 2004 Hugo Award for Best Novella.

References

External links
Text of the story
ISFDB entry for The Green Leopard Plague and Other Stories

2004 short stories
Nebula Award for Best Novella-winning works
Science fiction short stories
Works originally published in Asimov's Science Fiction